S. N. Parvathy is an Indian actress who appears in supporting roles in Tamil films and serials. She often plays roles of a mother in films. She has worked in popular movies like Anubavi Raja Anubavi, Pasi, Palaivana Solai, Agaya Gangai, Enga Ooru Pattukaran, Anna Nagar Muthal Theru and Chinna Mapillai. Her debut movie was Panam Tharum Parisu, released in 1965. She has acted in more than 200 films and 5000 dramas. She won the Kalaimamani award in 1985.

Film career 
Parvathy has acted seven plays in the same day. She started playing dramas at the age of 13. A. V. M. Rajan has acted in several plays from Troupe to Kathadi Ramamurthy's Troupe. She first acted as a mother in the film Panam Tharum Parisu. At the time, she was only 17 years old. Her life was spent in hardship until he starred in the movie Pasi. Since then, she has become a supporting actress.

Awards 
Parvathy is a recipient of the state government's Kalaimamani and Kalaiselvam awards.

Television

Filmography 
This is a partial filmography. You can expand it.

1960s

1970s

1980s

1990s

2000s

References

External links 
 

Tamil actresses
Indian film actresses
Indian television actresses
Actresses in Tamil cinema
Actresses in Tamil television
Tamil television actresses
21st-century Indian actresses
Year of birth missing (living people)
Living people
Actresses in Malayalam cinema